Pitambar is a 1992 Indian Hindi-language film directed by Imran, starring Mithun Chakraborty, Ravi Kishan, Raza Murad and Kiran Kumar.

Plot

Pitambar is the story of a man, who always stands for Justice.

Cast
Mithun Chakraborty 
Ravi Kishan
Raza Murad 
Kiran Kumar 
Jay Mathur 
Jaya Swami

Songs
"Aaja Aaja Na Na" - Kumar Sanu, Sadhana Sargam
"Baba Chale Hain" - Mohammed Aziz
"Dil Ne Tujhe Yaad Kiya" - Kumar Sanu, Sadhana Sargam
"Sajna Sajna" - Kumar Sanu, Sadhana Sargam
"Aaja Sanam" - Kumar Sanu, Dilraj Kaur
"Humko Jaana Tumse" - Kumar Sanu, Sadhana Sargam

External links
 
 http://ibosnetwork.com/asp/filmbodetails.asp?id=Pitambar

1992 films
1990s Hindi-language films